Operation Sailor Hat was a series of explosives effects tests, conducted by the United States Navy Bureau of Ships under the sponsorship of the Defense Atomic Support Agency. The tests consisted of two underwater explosions at San Clemente Island, California in 1964 and three surface explosions at Kahoolawe, Hawaii in 1965. They were non-nuclear tests employing large quantities of conventional explosives (TNT and HBX) to determine the effects of a nuclear weapon blast on naval vessels, and the first major test of this kind since Operation Crossroads in July 1946.

Each "Sailor Hat" test at Kahoolawe consisted of a dome-stacked  charge of TNT high explosive detonated on the shore close to the ships under test. Since a TNT detonation releases energy more slowly than a nuclear explosion, the blast effect at close range was designed to be equivalent to a  nuclear weapon at greater distance. The main ship used for testing was the former Cleveland-class light cruiser . These were a mixture of the obsolete, Atlanta being built during WWII, and the recently constructed Cochrane. The highly complex operation yielded data useful for determining and improving blast resistance of naval ships.

Background 
When the Limited Test Ban Treaty came into effect in 1963, it prohibited nuclear testing in the atmosphere. The Defense Atomic Support Agency turned to alternative methods of generating airblast effects with high explosives. The previous year in 1964, Operation Snowball was a 500-ton HE test on the Experimental Proving Ground in Alberta, Canada that provided technical information related to nuclear weapon detonation. In 1963, DASA called on the Bureau of Ships to conduct a full scale explosives test with conventional chemical explosives and a test site had to be chosen.

Following the Japanese attack on Pearl Harbor, the Territory of Hawaii was placed under martial law and the island of Kahoolawe was used as a training ground, fleet bombing, and gunnery range. This made it a natural choice for Operation Sailor Hat, since it also had deep waters close to shore and was only 90 miles away from the Pearl Harbor Naval Shipyard in Honolulu that could provide industrial support.

Preparations 

A test platform was needed for the operation that could mount a variety of equipment and structures. The light cruiser  was decommissioned in 1949 and placed in the Pacific Reserve Fleet, then in 1962 earmarked for disposal.  However, after undergoing extensive modifications at San Francisco Naval Shipyard she was converted to a target ship (reinstated as IX-304) to study the effects of high energy air explosions. The hull was cut down to the main deck level and two different types of destroyer deckhouses and three mast arrays were fitted. Representative destroyer systems for communication, detection, fire control and weapons delivery were installed and an experimental reinforced fiberglass deckhouse was constructed for comparison with aluminum ones used at the time. It was noted that in such an unusual configuration the refitted Atlanta received many stares and comments while en route to the test site in Hawaii.

The preparation of the charges was in itself an engineering feat. The TNT was supplied by the Naval Powder Factory in Hawthorne, NV that developed a method of producing high quality cast blocks from materials recovered from old torpedoes, mines and other weapons. A total of 92,022 4x12x12 inch blocks were produced for the tests. The Navy Construction Battalion Three had the hazardous task of carefully assembling 30,674 32.98-pound TNT blocks into 34 foot hemispheres that reached a height of 5 meter (17 feet) for each of the three tests. The domes were placed on thin octagonal concrete pads close to shore. In order to obtain the desired results, the ships also needed to be moored at precise distances from the charge for each test. This proved a difficult task in high winds and was accomplished with help from the Bureau of Ships, the tug  and salvage ships  and

Tests 
The first shots were performed during test Alpha using 20 tons of HBX explosives detonated 60 meters (200 feet) under water. The purpose was to determine the effects of underwater shock on equipment in preparation for the larger surface shots. The crew reported the blast sounding like a large hammer hitting the ship that caused the deck to move out from under their feet and paint to flake off of piping and bulkheads.
For the large surface shots, USS Atlanta was the primary close-in target ship, while the others were stationed more distantly so that they could be repaired more readily. For each successive test, the Atlanta would be placed closer to ground zero thus receiving more damage.

A central timing and firing system was on board Atlanta to direct photo planes, smoke rockets and hundreds of recording instruments, the synchronization of which was essential. The test shots resembled a small nuclear explosion, creating a shock wave on the water and an expanding shock condensation cloud. The fireball and mushroom cloud were present (but obviously no radiation or dangerous fallout was produced). The blast created an overpressure of 10 psi on the target, a moving wall of highly compressed air with maximum wind speeds of 294 mph. An overpressure blast of that magnitude is equivalent to a  burst at roughly 2400 meters (8000 feet) and is sufficient to be lethal and capable of destroying reinforced concrete buildings. Knowing the yield of the blast, this also implies the Atlanta was placed around 240 meters (800 feet) away from ground zero for that particular test. Two blimps were also destroyed high above ground, and a life size mannequin placed on the deck facing the blast was violently thrown over. The first test Bravo also produced a large amount of rock ejecta that caused secondary damage. To solve this problem, the second shot was placed over a five-foot mound of sand, and the last shot Delta was detonated over the previous crater that was back filled with 39,000 cubic yards of sand.

Effects 

On USS Atlanta, over 500 high-speed cameras on the ship recorded the effects of the blast. During the tests, the ship was manned by a 169-man navy crew and 60 scientific personnel who remained below deck. In spite of the topside damage, the crew below deck experienced only a shock equivalent to that experienced aboard an Iowa-class battleship firing a nine gun 16-inch salvo. Had there been personnel in the superstructures, they would have been violently thrown about. Topside, the SPS-37 and SPS-10 antennas as well as the URD-4 radio direction finder were torn off by the blast, while other structures were severely deformed. The AN/SPG-51 Tartar guided missile radar was put out of operation for one hour. While the anti-submarine ASROC launcher and Mark 32 torpedo tubes were damaged, the rockets and Mark 44 and Mark 46 torpedoes inside were intact. The Mark 25 torpedo tube was severely damaged, aluminum casting cracked, hold down bolts elongated, the insulating blanket destroyed and the muzzle door sprung, but surprisingly, the tube remained operational. The tripod mast carrying electronics gear was destroyed and fell to the deck. On the blast side, components of the hardened deck house sustained a permanent 2 inch deflection. The entire DLG 16 deck-house between two levels was blown in after welds were ruptured.

USS England was placed farthest from the blast center and thus experienced the least damage, the most serious of which was only a dent where a boulder had hit the ship. The shock wave reportedly caused the ship to move side to side by as much as 1.2 meters (4 feet).
 
On USS Cochrane, power was lost for 5 minutes after the ship was hit by the blast overpressure. She was able to restore power and return to Pearl Harbor Naval Shipyard for a hull and systems inspection and to assess the effects of the blast. The yard was impressed with how well the blast was resisted. After some minor repairs (Both the 3-Dimensional AN/SPS-39 & 2-Dimensional AN/SPS-40 Air Search Radar Antennas had to be replaced) Cochrane was cleared for her first deployment.

Results 

The operation demonstrated that some components were vulnerable to air blast, while others proved quite resilient. However, only low-cost improvements and minor design changes were needed without imposing unacceptable weight and cost factors or compromising operations. For example, although some antennas were incapacitated, antenna designs needed modifying only at the ruggedization level rather than at the concept level. The test data were intended also to be used in better damage-range standoff predictions and to provide design and specification information for better survivability in combat.

In addition to the projects directly associated with the ship evaluation program, various other projects were supported. These dealt with seismic effects, underwater acoustics, radio communications, cratering phenomena, free-field air blast measurements, fireball generation, cloud growth and electromagnetic effects.

The remaining crater left by the blast is called the "Sailor's Hat" crater and holds an anchialine pool containing Halocaridina rubra shrimp, which are salt-tolerant.

See also
 High explosive nuclear effects testing, list of non-nuclear explosives tests
 Minor Scale, largest non-nuclear test

References

External links

 
 YouTube video of Operation Sailor Hat

1965 in the United States
Explosions in 1965
Explosions in the United States
Maui County, Hawaii
United States Navy in the 20th century
Military projects of the United States
1965 in military history
Sailor Hat